Fur (alternative older spelling: Fuur) is a Danish island in the Limfjord. It is located just north of Salling peninsula within Skive municipality. As of 2022, the island covers an area of  21.8 km2 and has a total population of 752. Nederby, the largest town on the island, has 565 inhabitants (2020). 

In 2010, readers of the Danish newspaper Kristeligt Dagblad voted for Fur as "Denmark's most wonderful island", ahead of Læsø and Ærø. The island is linked to the mainland through a 24-hour ferry, the Sleipner-Fur ferry, sailing from Branden. The crossing of the Fur Strait takes 3–4 minutes.

Geography 
The island constitutes a unique geological formation within the region, called the Fur Formation. It is renowned for its deposits of diatomite, known in Danish as moler which is used for cat litter  Fossil hunting is a popular activity on the island, and the fossils one can find in the moler can be more than 55 million years old. The Fur Museum on the island features exhibits relating to the island, particularly fossils which have been found there.

Until 1860, the island had no forests, though several have since been established.

See also
 Fur Formation

References

External links
 Fursund turistinformation (in English)
 Fur Museum - The local museum
 News about Fur - FurNyt

Islands in the Limfjord
Islands of Denmark
Skive Municipality